Goonda is a 1984 Indian Telugu film directed by A. Kodandarami Reddy. This film stars Chiranjeevi, Radha, Kaikala Satyanarayana, Rao Gopal Rao and Allu Ramalingiah.

Plot 
Ravi (Chiranjeevi) is the son of a sincere Police officer (Satyanarayana). Ravi accidentally hurts his neighbour's eyes and becomes responsible for his blindness. Fearing that his father would scold him, he runs away from home and is brought up by a don in Calcutta, who names him Kalidas. The don dies in an encounter and Kali is asked to leave the world of crime and become a good citizen. Kalidas changes his name to Raja and while traveling in a train, saves his father, later realising their relationship. Because of his criminal background he does not reveal that he is his son. Satyanarayana takes him to his house and introduces Raja to his family members. His father is to face the local goons headed by Rao Gopala Rao. In the meantime he meets Radha and came to realise that she is the daughter of the person who became blind because of him. Raja helps her in having her father's eyesight returned and wins her heart. How he wins the hearts of his family members and helps his father in catching the local goondas is the rest of the story.

Cast
 Chiranjeevi
 Radha
 Kaikala Satyanarayana
 Rao Gopal Rao
 Allu Ramalingiah
 Nutan Prasad
 Rajeev
 Annapoorna
Silk Smitha

External links
 

1984 films
1984 action films
Films directed by A. Kodandarami Reddy
Films scored by K. Chakravarthy
1980s Telugu-language films
Indian action films